Euborellia hispanica is a species of earwig in the family Anisolabididae.

References

Anisolabididae
Insects described in 1981